Járnsaxa (Old Norse: , "iron dagger") is a jötunn in Norse mythology. In Snorri Sturluson's Prose Edda, she is portrayed as Thor's lover and as the mother of Magni, a three-year-old boy with prodigious force.

Name 
The Old Norse name Járnsaxa has been translated as 'iron dagger', or 'armed-with-an-iron-sword'.

Attestations 
In Hyndluljóð, Járnsaxa is named as one of the Nine Mothers of Heimdallr.

In Skáldskaparmál, Thor's wife the goddess Sif is either herself called "Járnsaxa" or called by a kenning meaning "the rival of Járnsaxa", throwing confusion on whether Sif is or is not distinct from Járnsaxa the mother of Magni. At the end of the story, Odin argues that Thor did wrong to offer the splendid horse Gullfaxi to Magni, the son of a giantess, rather than to himself, the father of Thor.

Notes

References

Gýgjar
Thor